Mena or MENA may refer to:

Arts, entertainment, and media
Mena (album), a 2010 album by Javiera Mena
MENA (news), an Egyptian publicly funded news agency
Mena Report, a business news source
Mena, the original title of the 2017 film American Made, about the life of drug smuggler Barry Seal starring Tom Cruise

People
Mena (surname), list of people with the surname
Mena (given name), list of people with the given name

Places
MENA, acronym for Middle East and North Africa

Americas
Francisco Z. Mena Municipality in Puebla, Mexico
Juan de Mena, Paraguay, a district of Cordillera Department
Mena, Arkansas, United States
Mena School District

Africa
Abu Mena, pilgrimage center in Late Antique Egypt
Mena House Hotel, a resort near Cairo, Egypt
Mena River, in eastern Ethiopia
Mena, Koulikoro, Mali
Mena, Sikasso, Mali

Asia
Mena Station, railway station in Rankoshi, Isoya District, Hokkaidō, Japan
Mena, Badin, a village in Sindh, Pakistan

Europe
Mena, Cornwall, hamlet in England
Valle de Mena (Valley of Mena), a municipality in Burgos, Spain
Mena Raion, abolished district of Chernihiv Oblast, Ukraine
Mena, Ukraine, city in Chernihiv Oblast
 Mena River, a river in Ukraine, a tributary of Desna River

In Space
 Mena (Mercurian crater), on Mercury
 Mena (Martian crater), on Mars

Science and technology
MENA (cable system), a planned submarine telecommunications link between Italy and India
Mena, one of three members of the Ena/Vasp homology proteins in mice
Mena, a genus of sea anemone

Mythological uses
Mena or Dea Mena, a Roman goddess of menstruation; see List of Roman birth and childhood deities
Mena, or Menavati or Mainavati, a Hindu goddess, wife of the mountain king Himalaya-personified as Himavan

See also

Luis Mena (disambiguation)

Menas (disambiguation)
Meena (disambiguation)
Mene (disambiguation)
Mina (disambiguation)